is a Japanese manga series written and illustrated by Tsuya Tsuya. It was serialized in Akita Shoten's seinen manga magazine Young Champion Retsu from March 2010 to June 2014.

Publication
Akita Shoten has collected its chapters in five tankōbon volumes, released from October 20, 2011, to June 20, 2014.

Volume list

See also
Rakujitsu no Pathos, another manga series by the same author
Futari no Ouchi, another manga series by the same author
Shiori's Diary, another manga series by the same author

References

Akita Shoten manga
Romance anime and manga
Seinen manga